Frontier Communications of Mondovi LLC is a telephone operating of Frontier Communications providing local telephone services to Mondovi, Wisconsin. The company was founded in 1904 as the Mondovi Telephone Company. It was later acquired by Rochester Telephone.

In 1994, Rochester Tel changed its name to Frontier Corporation, resulting in Mondovi Telephone becoming Frontier Communications of Mondovi, Inc. The company later became an LLC. Many people regard Frontier Communications as the worst in the industry, offering a 3Mbps connection in rural Mondovi. Users rarely receive said speeds.

There was an outage on 4/25/17 that lasted from approximately 10:30AM to 4:17PM.

References

Frontier Communications
Communications in Wisconsin
Buffalo County, Wisconsin
1904 establishments in Wisconsin
Telecommunications companies established in 1904
Telecommunications companies of the United States
American companies established in 1904